Bruce Mitchell (born 6 June 1940) is an English jazz drummer, who plays regularly with Vini Reilly in the Durutti Column.

Biography
Mitchell was born in the suburb of Didsbury, in the south of Manchester, on 6 June 1940.

He had no formal musical education. His father was a drummer and a bass player. He was in a Manchester trad band, around 1960, and during a time, he was a hippie. Prior to 1974 he was in the group Greasy Bear. In 1974 he joined comedy rock band Alberto y Lost Trios Paranoias; the band folded in 1982.

He also helps run Manchester Light and Stage.

Mitchell joined The Durutti Column in 1981 for the album LC, and has managed the band.

References

English rock drummers
British male drummers
British post-punk musicians
1940 births
People from Didsbury
Living people
The Durutti Column members
Musicians from Manchester